Pavle Beljanski (Veliko Gradište, Kingdom of Serbia, 19 June 1892 – Belgrade, Yugoslavia, 14 July 1965) was a Serbian lawyer and diplomat, art lover and great connoisseur, collector who acquired the most complete collection of Serbian paintings from the first half of the 20th century, and by giving it to Serbian people, became one of its greatest contributors.

Biography
He attended high school in Belgrade, where he also studied law until the beginning of World War I, when he left for Paris. He graduated at the Sorbonne and began post-graduate studies there as well. He started his diplomatic career in Stockholm, and continued it in Warsaw, Berlin, Vienna, Paris, Rome and Belgrade. Residing in European capitals between World Wars, he was in a position to study the greatest works of art and to meet famous persons like Jovan Dučić, Ivo Andrić, Rastko Petrović, Milutin Milanković, Veljko Petrović, Isidora Sekulić, as well as the artists whose works will constitute a part of his collection: Nadežda Petrović, Milan Konjović, Kosta Hakman, Zora Petrović, Milo Milunović, Sreten Stojanović, and Jefto Perić. All this inspired his passion for collecting art. At first, he was interested in European, mostly Renaissance art, but he realized that the first-class artworks of the Old Masters were beyond his reach. While spending time with young artists, he concentrated on contemporary art. After a while, his collection of paintings, sculptures, tapestries and drawings of at that time relatively unknown authors grew into a unique collection of exquisite works of art. Tragic circumstances – the death of seven members of his family during the bombing of Svilajnac in 1944, – left Beljanski without the possibility of sharing the beauty of his collection with his dearest, so he decided to donate it to the Serbian people.

Pavle Beljanski wrote what his collection meant to him:

"Svaka od tih slika deo je mog života! Svaka od njih je prošla kroz moje srce."
Each one of these paintings is part of my life! Each of them went through my heart.

The Pavle Beljanski Memorial Collection

See also
The Pavle Beljanski Memorial Collection in Novi Sad

References

External links
  - Official site (Serbian)

1892 births
1965 deaths
University of Paris alumni
Serbian diplomats
Yugoslav lawyers
Yugoslav diplomats
20th-century Serbian lawyers
People from Veliko Gradište
Yugoslav expatriates in Sweden
Yugoslav expatriates in Germany
Yugoslav expatriates in France
Yugoslav expatriates in Italy